|}

This is a list of electoral district results for the Victorian 1935 election.

Results by electoral district

Albert Park 

 Two party preferred vote was estimated.

Allandale

Ballarat

Barwon 

 Preferences were not distributed.

Benalla

Benambra

Bendigo

Boroondara

Brighton

Brunswick

Bulla and Dalhousie

Carlton 

 Two party preferred vote was estimated.

Castlemaine and Kyneton

Caulfield

Clifton Hill

Coburg

Collingwood 

 Two party preferred vote was estimated.

Dandenong

Dundas

Essendon

Evelyn 

 Preferences were not distributed.

Flemington

Footscray

Geelong

Gippsland East

Gippsland North 

 Preferences were not distributed.

Gippsland South

Gippsland West

Goulburn Valley

Grant

Gunbower

Hampden

Hawthorn

Heidelberg

Kara Kara and Borung

Kew

Korong and Eaglehawk

Lowan

Maryborough and Daylesford 

 Two party preferred vote was estimated.

Melbourne

Mildura 

 Preferences were not distributed.

Mornington

Northcote

Nunawading

Oakleigh

Ouyen

Polwarth

Port Fairy and Glenelg

Port Melbourne

Prahran

Richmond

Rodney 

 Preferences were not distributed.

St Kilda

Stawell and Ararat

Swan Hill

Toorak

Upper Goulburn

Upper Yarra

Walhalla

Wangaratta and Ovens

Waranga 

 Coyle was elected as a UAP member for Waranga in the 1932 election, but joined the Country party in 1933.

Warrenheip and Grenville

Warrnambool

Williamstown

Wonthaggi 

 Two party preferred vote was estimated.

See also 

 1935 Victorian state election
 Candidates of the 1935 Victorian state election
 Members of the Victorian Legislative Assembly, 1935–1937

References 

Results of Victorian state elections
1930s in Victoria (Australia)